The Samogitian Party (or ) is an ethnic-regionalist autonomist party of the Lithuania's Samogitian minority founded in April 2008.

Creation
In 2008, the Ministry of Justice refused to register the party claiming that there were not enough participants at its inaugural meeting, but also that the programme failed to explicitly recognize the State of Lithuania's territorial integrity and indivisibility and the fact that the Lithuanian language is the national language. The Ministry finally registered the party in February 2009, a recognition that was indispensable for taking part to any election.

Aims
The Samogitian Party wants Samogitia to become an area where the Samogitian language would have official status and where Samogitians would have the right to declare their ethnic nationality.

Membership and party structure
The party has 1,100 members, according to party sources. Several local branches of the party have been established, including one in London, created in May 2009.

Electoral results
The Samogitian Party took part at the 2009 European Parliament election and received 6,961 votes (1.23% of the total). It got more than 4% of the votes (the electoral threshold for the municipal elections) in the four districts of the Telšiai County, in the Mažeikiai district municipality (544 votes, 6,27%), in the Rietavas municipality (95 votes, 5,04%), in the Plungė district municipality (356 votes, 5,76%) and in the Telšiai district municipality (501 votes, 5,84%), and in three districts (out of seven) of the Klaipėda County, i.e. the Kretinga district municipality (373 votes, 5,67%), in the Skuodas district municipality (253 votes, 6,84%) and the Klaipėda district municipality (341 votes, 4,49%).

In 2012, the party chairman Egidijus Skarbalius, participated as a candidate from The Way of Courage party.

Political context
The respondents in the various censuses do not have the option to choose for the Samogitian ethnicity, a situation similar to the Polish Kashubians and Silesians. This had already been contested before courts by the Žemaitē bova, īr ė būs ("Samogitians were, are and will be") Association, also named Žemaitiu soeiga, which considers that it is a violation of the Constitution, more particularly of the provision that everyone has the right to decide on his nationality. According to Egidijus Skarbalius, the founder of the Samogitian Party, Samogitians could be as many as one million, thus representing a third of Lithuania's total population.

By the end of 2008, the Council of Skuodas district municipality had decided from then on held all its meetings in the Samogitian language. Lithuanian councilmen will have access to interpreters if what is spoken is not entirely comprehensible.

References

External links
Official website (in Lithuanian)

Political parties of minorities in Lithuania
Political parties in Lithuania
2008 establishments in Lithuania
Political parties established in 2008